This is a list of notable events in country music that took place in the year 1934.

Events 
 August – Decca Records, Inc. established in New York City
 July – Columbia Phonograph Company purchased by the American Record Corporation (ARC)

Top Hillbilly (Country) Recordings

The Great Depression continued to wreak havoc on the American record industry in 1934. The Grigsby-Grunow Company, owner of Columbia Phonograph Company, failed, and Columbia was put up for sale. Columbia operations, catalogue and trademarks, as well as Okeh Records, were purchased by the American Record Corporation (ARC) for $70,000 in July 1934. Columbia's pressing and warehouse facilities, along with equipment and machines, were absorbed by ARC, but for the next four years, both labels were dormant. Decca Records, Ltd., London, UK, formed Decca Records, Inc. in the United States, and began operations in August 1934. Three former Brunswick managers, including Jack Kapp, were hired.

The following songs were extracted from records included in Joel Whitburn's Pop Memories 1890-1954, record sales reported on the "Discography of American Historical Recordings" website, and other sources as specified. Numerical rankings are approximate, they are only used as a frame of reference.

Births 
 March 18 – Charley Pride, singer and songwriter, country music's first African-American star (d. 2020)
 March 31 – John D. Loudermilk, singer and songwriter (died 2016).
 April 1 – Jim Ed Brown, pop-styled singer who enjoyed success as part of a family group (The Browns), as a solo artist and as part of a duet (with Helen Cornelius), spanning the 1950s through early 1980s (died 2015).
 August 5 – Vern Gosdin, "The Voice" of many honky tonk-styled hits from the 1970s through early 1990s (died 2009).
 August 27 – Frances Preston, music executive (died 2012).
 October 24 – Sanger D. Shafer, AKA "Whitey" Shafer, songwriter (died 2019).

Deaths

Further reading 
 Kingsbury, Paul, "Vinyl Hayride: Country Music Album Covers 1947–1989," Country Music Foundation, 2003
 Millard, Bob, "Country Music: 70 Years of America's Favorite Music," HarperCollins, New York, 1993
 Whitburn, Joel. "Top Country Songs 1944–2005 – 6th Edition." 2005.

References

Country
Country music by year